Jeremy Heimans is co-founder and CEO of Purpose and the co-author of New Power: How Power Works in Our Hyperconnected World - and How to Make It Work for You. He has a TED talk on the topic named What new power looks like.

Heimans is an entrepreneur and political activist, who co-founded the Australian political movement GetUp! and global online political community Avaaz.org. A 2018 profile in The Monthly noted that Heimans "might be the most influential and connected Australian in the world".

Background
Heimans attended Sydney Boys High School. He studied at the University of Sydney, where he was awarded the University Medal in Government, and the Harvard University John F. Kennedy School of Government.

Heimans, as a child activist in his native Australia, he ran media campaigns and lobbied leaders on issues like children's rights and nuclear non-proliferation. In 2004, Heimans dropped out of Oxford to co-found a campaign group in the U.S. presidential elections that used crowd-funding to help a group of women whose loved ones were in Iraq hire a private jet to follow Vice-President Dick Cheney on his campaign stops, in what became known as the "Chasing Cheney" tour.

Career
Heimans began his career with the strategy consultants McKinsey & Company.

In 2005, Heimans co-founded GetUp, an Australian political organization. In 2007, Heimans was a co-founder of Avaaz.org, a global civic organization that operates in 15 languages and claims over forty million members in 194 countries. In 2003 he was a research associate at the University of Oxford Global Economics Governance Programme, researching multi-actor global funds.

In 2009, Heimans co-founded Purpose, a social impact agency. Purpose uses public mobilization and storytelling to help organizations, activists, businesses, and philanthropies create participatory campaigns, and to create campaigning labs and new initiatives that can shift policies and change public narratives. Purpose is a certified B Corp and Public Benefit Corporation, headquartered in New York with offices in the UK, India, Brazil, Australia, and Kenya. Since its launch, Purpose has launched several new organizations including All Out, a 2 million-strong LGBT rights group, and advised institutions like the ACLU, Google, and The Bill and Melinda Gates Foundation.

Heimans' TED Talk, What new power looks like, has been viewed over 1.4 million times.

Jeremy co-wrote the national bestseller New Power: How Power Works in Our Hyperconnected World - and How to Make It Work for You with Henry Timms, published by Penguin Random House in 2018. New Power has been praised by writers and public figures, including Richard Branson, David Brooks, Malcolm Gladwell, Daniel Pink, Susan Cain, Jane Goodall, Alicia Garza, Russell Brand, Reid Hoffman, Ai-jen Poo, Adam Grant, Craig Newmark, Paul Polman, Howard Dean, Anne-Marie Slaughter, and more. David Brooks wrote a feature about New Power in the New York Times, where he described the book as "the best window I've seen into this new world". The Guardian has described New Power as "a manual on how to navigate the 21st century". Stanford Social Innovation Review described New Power as the "road map to a new world". It was also shortlisted for the Financial Times and McKinsey Business Book of the Year Award.

Heimans lives in New York.

Awards and honors
In 2011, Heimans received the Ford Foundation's 75th Anniversary Visionary Award for his work building "powerful, tech-savvy movements that can transform culture and influence policy". In 2012, Fast Company ranked him 11th on their annual list of the 100 Most Creative People in Business. His work has been profiled in publications like Harvard Business Review, The Economist and The New York Times.

Heimans has been a keynote speaker at venues such as the World Economic Forum at Davos, TED, the United Nations, The Guardian Activate, and the Business Innovation Factory.

References

External links
 Purpose: Jeremy Heimans, Co-founder & Chief Executive Officer
 
 May 2018 interview with Heimans on Radio New Zealand's Sunday Morning about his career, company, and a book he co-wrote with Henry Timms entitled New Power.

1970s births
Living people
Australian activists
People educated at Sydney Boys High School
Harvard Kennedy School alumni
Australian people of Lebanese descent
Australian Jews
Alumni of the University of Oxford
Australian chief executives